The 1978 International cricket season was from May 1978 to August 1978.

Season overview

May

Pakistan in England

July

New Zealand in England

References

1978 in cricket